Marie Pavlovna can refer to:
 Marie Pavlovna, Duchess of Sodermanland
 Grand Duchess Maria Pavlovna of Russia (1786–1859)

See also
 Grand Duchess Maria of Russia (disambiguation)